Ngarigo (Ngarigu) is a nearly extinct Australian Aboriginal language, the traditional language of the Ngarigo people of inland far southeast New South Wales.

Yaithmathang (Jaitmathang), also known as Gundungerre, was a dialect.

Phonology 

Vowels given are /a i u/.

References

Yuin–Kuric languages
Extinct languages of New South Wales